La Mott is an unincorporated residential community in Cheltenham Township, Montgomery County, Pennsylvania, United States. It borders Philadelphia along Cheltenham Avenue.

The name honors Lucretia Mott, who lived here from the 1850s to her death in 1880. Her house, Roadside (demolished in 1911), was a major stop on the Underground Railroad. There are 65 locations in the continental United States named Mott, but this is the only one named "La Mott." La Mott has the ZIP code of 19027.

Formerly known as Camptown (or "Camp Town"), La Mott was the site of Camp William Penn, the first federal training site for black soldiers during the Civil War.

Gallery

See also

Camptown Historic District

References

External links

 Camptown Historic Site Profile

Unincorporated communities in Montgomery County, Pennsylvania
Unincorporated communities in Pennsylvania
Populated places on the Underground Railroad
Cheltenham Township, Pennsylvania